Cayo Largo del Sur, or simply Cayo Largo ("Long Key”), is a small resort island in Cuba, off the south coast of the northwestern part of the main island in the Caribbean Sea. Cayo Largo is part of the special municipality of Isla de la Juventud.

History
Christopher Columbus is said to have visited the island on his second expedition in 1494, and Sir Francis Drake may have also stopped on the island during his circumnavigation of the globe. Pirates also likely used the island as a base. Today, pristine beach, scuba diving, and wildlife draw tourists to the island, but no people live there permanently; locals who work in the hotels stay for about 20 days, then return to their families on nearby islands. There are five all-inclusive resort hotels on the island. Flights from Argentina, Italy, and Canada serve the island. Flights from Miami were halted in December 2019 due to a October U.S. Transportation Department ruling that suspended flights from the U.S. to nine airports in Cuba. The policy stopped air service to all Cuban airports except Havana. On February 20, 2020, damage to the only airport runway forced tourist passengers return to the mainland via boat. A large catamaran style ferry provides surface transportation.

Geography

Climate

Tourism
Typically, the fine white sand is packed hard on the surf's edge and allows easy walking.

A major tourist attraction of Cayo Largos are the west beaches, Playa Sirena, and Playo Paraiso. These beaches are a kilometre apart, and one may easily walk between them when the tide is not full. Sirena offers full service facilities for tourists. A shuttle "train" service takes tourists from the resorts to these beaches is no longer operating though it had been operating for years (taxis are still available for this purpose). Paraiso offers one of the finest undeveloped beaches in the world. Activities on the beach may be curtailed during turtle egg laying season. The beach has water sports related to the hotels, a restaurant, dolphin attraction, docks for catamaran trips. The lee side of the beach features tidal flats where many very large starfish congregate and other tropical fish are easily viewed.

Travellers to Cayo Largo should be advised nudism is tolerated in Cayo Largo and is practiced on the periphery of the resorts in designated areas, and on the many desolate stretches of beaches (20 km) on this island.

Natural environment

Cayo Largo is a limestone island, formed over millions of years from the remains of marine organisms, such as the ones that build coral reefs. Living coral reefs form one more attraction for tourists on this island, although coral bleaching has stressed some reef communities in the Caribbean. The northern coast of Cayo Largo consists largely of mangroves and salt pans. While the water south of the island appears clear enough to reveal the underlying ocean floor, the water on the north side of the island is cloudy. This cloudy water indicates that sediment is washing off the land surface and into the water or is being stirred up from the shallow sea floor.

In November 2001, the entire island was covered by storm surge in Hurricane Michelle.

Transport
Vilo Acuña Airport (IATA: CYO, ICAO: MUCL) is an international airport on the island.

References

External links

CayoLargo.net 
Cayo-Largo.net

Largo del Sur
Populated places in Isla de la Juventud
Resorts in Cuba